Yan Qingyu (born 4 May 1966) is a Chinese actress best known for her roles in Divorce Contract (1990), Keeping Moon at Heart (2000), The Heaven Sword and Dragon Saber (2003) and The Demi-Gods and Semi-Devils (2013).

Early life and education
Yan was born in Xicheng District, Beijing, on May 4, 1966, to a military family, while her ancestral home in Shandong. She was raised in Sichuan. She graduated from the China Social University.

Acting career
Yan began her career with guest roles in two historical films, including Reign Behind a Curtain (1982) and The Burning of Imperial Palace (1982).

In 1986, she appeared as Xue Baochan in Wang Fulin's Dream of the Red Chamber, adapted from Cao Xueqin's classical novel of the same title, the series was one of the most watched ones in mainland China in that year.    .

Yan portrayed Concubine Hui in The Empress Dowager (1988), which was set to premiere in 1988. In the following year, she was cast as Sun Lanxiang in Ordinary World, based on the novel by the same name by Lu Yao.	

In 1991, she played the role of Yue Rong, a singer, in the film Divorce Contract, for which she received a Best Supporting Actress nomination at the 14th Hundred Flowers Awards.

In 1998, Yan played a supporting role in the wuxia television series The Return of the Condor Heroes, starring Richie Ren and Jacklyn Wu and directed by Young Pei-pei. The TV drama is an adaptation based on the novel of the same name by Hong Kong novelist Jin Yong. In the following year, she had a supporting role in The Legendary Siblings, based on the novel by the same name by Taiwanese novelist Gu Long.

In 2001, she earned a Best Supporting Actress at the 24th Hundred Flowers Awards for her performance as Zhao Yuelan in Keeping Moon at Heart.

Yan had a supporting role in The Heaven Sword and Dragon Saber (2003), a wuxia television series starring Alec Su, Alyssa Chia and Gao Yuanyuan. The Television series adaptation based on the novel of the same name by Jin Yong.

In 2010, she appeared in Pepper and Pickles, a romantic comedy television series starring Xie Na and Kang Ta.

Yan was cast in the historical comedy The Smart Kongkong, playing the wife of Pan Changjiang's character.

In 2014, she had key supporting role in The Demi-Gods and Semi-Devils, adapted from Jin Yong's novel of the same title.

Yan participated in Le Coup de Foudre, a web series based on the novel I Don't Like This World, I Only Like You by Qiao Yi.

Filmography

Film

Television

Film and TV Awards

References

External links
 

1966 births
Living people
Actresses from Beijing
Chinese film actresses
Chinese television actresses
20th-century Chinese actresses
21st-century Chinese actresses